Max Langenhan (born 21 February 1999) is a German luger who competes for the BRC 05 Friedrichroda club and German national team.  
 
He represented his country at the 2022 Winter Olympics.

Career

Youth and Junior career
Max Langenhan was successful at national level at early years of his career and made his international debut in January 2015 in the Youth A World Cup. In his debut race in Oberhof, he took second place just behind his compatriot German luger Lucas Geyer. In the next two races of the season, he secured third and second place in Igls and Winterberg, respectively.  In just three races he finished seventh overall. In that season, he finished seventh overall after only three races.

In 2015/16 season, Langenhan advanced to the Junior World Cup. After a fall at the start of the season in Lillehammer, he finished third place behind Daniil Lebedev and Jonas Müller on the Sigulda track. He didn't finish on the podium again in the rest of the season, although he never finished worse than eighth place. During the season Langenhan contested first international competitions. At the 2016 European Junior Championships he finished fifth in Altenberg and sixth at the 2016 World Junior Championships in Winterberg. In the overall ranking of the Junior World Cup, he also finished sixth.

The 2016/17 season was exceptianally successful for Langenhan. He won gold medal at the 2017 Junior European Championships in singles discipline and also won the gold medal with Jessica Tiebel and the doubles Hannes Orlamünder and Paul Gubitz in the team relay race. At the 2017 Junior World Championships in Sigulda, where Langenhan won the bronze medal behind Kristers Aparjods and Nico Gleirscher. In addition, he also took silver medal with Tiebel and Orlamünder/Gubitz in the team relay behind the representative from Russia.

The 2017/18 season was Langenhan's last at junior level. He won all the races he competed for including the two races in Oberhof, the race at Königssee, two races in Igls and in Winterberg. In Igls and in Winterberg he also won with the German team relay, which included Cheyenne Rosenthal and Orlamünder/Gubitz in Igls, Rosenthal in Winterberg as well as Hendrik Seibert and Calvin Luke Meister. The races in Winterberg were also the Junior European Championships 2018. At the 2018 Junior World Championships in Altenberg, Langenhan won the title in the singles ahead of his compatriots David Nößler, Paul-Lukas Heider and Moritz Bollmann. He also won the team relay title with Tiebel and Orlamünder/Gubitz.

Senior career
In 2018-19 season, he promoted to the World cup team after Andi Langenhan, who is not related to Max, resigned and Ralf Palik's retirement. He finished 12th place in his debut World Cup race in Innsbruck. During the season, Langenhan competed in Igls for the last time at the Junior World Championships. On the Innsbruck track he defended his title from last year in front of Bastian Schulte and Lukas Gufler in singles discipline and won the silver medal behind Austria in the team relay race with Cheyenne Rosenthal, and doubles Hannes Orlamünder/Paul Gubitz. In Oberhof, he returned to the World Cup in 22nd place after missing the Altenberg race due to the Junior World Championships. He finished eighth in the overall Sprint World Cup standings and 17th in the overall World Cup standings with 300 points.

The 2020 European Championships held in Lillehammer, where he finished 11th place. In the overall World Cup standings, Langenhan finished ninth with 462 points in the 2019-20 season. 

In the 2020-21 season, he achieved his first ever podium finish in singles race on the Altenberg track. At the sprint race in Winterberg he celebrated the first World Cup victory of his career.  At the 2021 Luge World Championships in Königssee, he just missed the podium with fourth place. In the overall World Cup rankings, he achieved fourth place thus the best position in his career so far.

The 2021/22 season started with the German Championships in Altenberg, where Langenhan won the silver medal in the singles. With the team relay around Cheyenne Rosenthal and Robin Geueke as well as David Gamm he also achieved the bronze medal. At the first World Cup race on the Olympic track in Beijing, he finished on the podium for the third time in his career behind a German lugers Johannes Ludwig and Felix Loch.

At the 2023 Luge World Championships in Oberhof, Langenhan won the team relay title with Anna Berreiter and doubles Benecken/Eggert, silver medal in the individual race and bronze in the sprint competition.

World Cup

References

External links

Max Langenhan at the Bob und Schlittenverband Deutschland 

1999 births
Living people
German male lugers
Olympic lugers of Germany
Lugers at the 2022 Winter Olympics
21st-century German people